Incredible is the first and only studio album by girl group Clique Girlz. In promotion of the upcoming album, an EP entitled Clique Girlz was released in April 2008. The band also released "Incredible," a single available for digital download on iTunes and other online music stores. They also released another EP entitled Smile to iTunes. Their last release was an EP called Incredible.

Promotion
The album features the singles: "Then I Woke Up", "Incredible," and "Smile." "Then I Woke Up" and "Smile" both reached #2 on the US Hot Singles Sales chart. It also includes many other songs that have been released before by the Clique Girlz, such as "Smile" and "The Difference In Me" from their debut EP, Clique Girlz.

Incredible was supposed to come out in the summer of 2008, but the album was pushed back several times until its eventual cancellation.

The Clique Girlz have filmed music videos for "Then I Woke Up", "Incredible" and "You Think". The videos are all available on iTunes. The official Vevo however only has "Then I Woke Up" and "Incredible".

The group toured extensively throughout 2008, and performed "Incredible" on The Today Show on June 17, 2008. The Clique Girlz touring consisted of many other promotional appearances opening for artists such as: Demi Lovato, the Jonas Brothers, The Cheetah Girls and the Backstreet Boys.

Track listing

Release history

References

2008 debut albums
Clique Girlz albums
Interscope Records albums